Andreas Kröhler (born 1 November 1966) is a former German football player who played as a forward. Krohler has played in the European Cup and Bundesliga with 1. FC Kaiserslautern.

Career statistics

References

External links
 
 
 
 

1966 births
Living people
German footballers
Association football forwards
1. FC Kaiserslautern players
1. FC Kaiserslautern II players
Wormatia Worms players
Bundesliga players